This is a list of presidential visits to foreign countries made by Frank-Walter Steinmeier, the current President of Germany. Steinmeier was elected on 12 February 2017 and assumed the office for a five-year term on 19 March 2017, succeeding Joachim Gauck.

2017

2018

2019

2020

2021

2022

2023

References

External links
 Official website about the appointments and journeys of the Federal President of Germany

State visits by German presidents
Lists of diplomatic trips
Germany diplomacy-related lists